The Ottawa metropolitan area is the metropolitan area also known as the National Capital Region encompassing the capital of Canada.

The Ottawa metropolitan area may also refer to:
The Ottawa, Illinois micropolitan area, United States
The Ottawa, Kansas micropolitan area, United States

See also
Ottawa (disambiguation)